The 2001 CA-TennisTrophy was a men's tennis tournament played on indoor hard courts at the Wiener Stadthalle in Vienna, Austria, and was part of the International Series Gold of the 2001 ATP Tour. It was the 27th edition and took place from 8 October through 14 October 2001. Sixth-seeded Tommy Haas won the singles title.

Finals

Singles

 Tommy Haas defeated  Guillermo Cañas 6–2, 7–6(8–6), 6–4
 It was Haas' 3rd title of the year and the 4th of his career.

Doubles

 Martin Damm /  Radek Štěpánek defeated  Jiří Novák /  David Rikl 6–3, 6–2
 It was Damm's 2nd title of the year and the 20th of his career. It was Štěpánek's 3rd title of the year and the 4th of his career.

References

External links
 Official website
 ATP tournament profile
 ITF tournament edition details

CA-TennisTrophy
Vienna Open